Rhaphidopsis is a genus of longhorn beetles of the subfamily Lamiinae, containing the following species:

 Rhaphidopsis melaleuca Gerstäcker, 1855
 Rhaphidopsis zonaria (Thomson, 1857)

References

Tragocephalini
Cerambycidae genera